Robert Peter Bodak (born May 28, 1961 in Thunder Bay, Ontario) is a retired professional ice hockey player who played in the National Hockey League for the Calgary Flames and Hartford Whalers. A career minor-leaguer, Bodak played only three games with the Flames in 1987–88 and one more with the Whalers in 1989–90. He did not record a point, but had 29 penalty minutes in his four games.

Career statistics

Regular season and playoffs

External links 
 

1961 births
Living people
Albany Choppers players
Binghamton Rangers players
Binghamton Whalers players
Calgary Flames players
Canadian expatriate ice hockey players in the United States
Canadian ice hockey left wingers
Erie Panthers players
Hartford Whalers players
Ice hockey people from Ontario
Sportspeople from Thunder Bay
Moncton Golden Flames players
Rochester Americans players
Salt Lake Golden Eagles (IHL) players
San Diego Gulls (IHL) players
Springfield Indians players
Undrafted National Hockey League players